Brian Ian Whittle (born 26 April 1964) is a Scottish politician and former athlete, who has been a Member of the Scottish Parliament (MSP) for the South Scotland region since 2016. A member of the Scottish Conservatives, he serves as Shadow Minister for Environment, Biodiversity and Land Reform.

Whittle won the gold medal in the 4 x 400 metres relay at both the 1986 European Athletics Championships and 1994 European Athletics Championships. He also competed at the 1988 Summer Olympics in Seoul.

Early life
Whittle was born in 1964 growing up in the Scottish town of Troon. His father was a sprinter until his late teens. Whilst at school, Brian tried a wide range of sports, enjoying many of them but it was apparent that he had a natural talent for running. He has maintained that his talent lay in his discipline and ability to train.

Brian Whittle was educated at Marr College in Troon and went on to read Chemistry at The University of Glasgow and Kilmarnock College.

Athletic career
At club level, Whittle ran for both Ayr Seaforth and Enfield & Haringey. His best performance in the 400 m was 45.22 at the 1988 Summer Olympics in Seoul. He finished 1st in his heat, 3rd in the quarter-final, but did not progress past the semi-final. He ran 45.5 on the first leg of the 4 × 400 m relay (team – Whittle, Kriss Akabusi, Todd Bennett, Phil Brown), but for once the GB team performed below par and finished fifth in the Olympic final.  Perhaps his greatest achievement, and what he is best remembered for, is the manner in which he helped Great Britain win the gold medal in the 4 x 400 metres relay at the 1986 European Championships in Stuttgart. He ran the third leg of the race with one shoe, running a personal best leg time of 45.09. As he took the baton from Kriss Akabusi, Akabusi stood on his shoe and it ripped off, leaving him to run the race without it (thereafter the press nicknamed him 'One-shoe Whittle'). The other members of the team were Roger Black and Derek Redmond, all of whom ran Personal Best times on the day.

Whittle also won a relay gold medal in the 1994 European Athletics Championships 4 × 400 metres relay team alongside David McKenzie, Roger Black, and Du'aine Ladejo. He also ran in the heats of the 4 × 400 m relay at the 1990 European Championships in Split.

He moved to 800 m after the 1988 Olympic Games, and ran in the final of the 1990 Commonwealth Games 800 m in New Zealand, where he finished fourth ahead of Sebastian Coe and Tom McKean. Whittle ran the last leg of the Commonwealth Games 4 × 400 m in 1990, anchoring the Scottish Team to a silver medal. He ran 44.7 seconds for his leg.

He also ran the 800 m in the 1991 World Championships in Tokyo. His personal best for 800 m was 1:45.47 in 1990.

Other notable performances included running 45.98 at the 1988 European Indoor Championships in Budapest winning the silver medal – a feat he repeated in 1989. He ran the last leg of the winning 4 × 400 m relay in the Europa Cup in 1989 (Gateshead), helping Great Britain to win the team title for the first time.

Whittle was an international schools' high jumper, and also competed in the 200m at the 1986 Commonwealth Games, making the semi-final.

Political career
Whittle contested the 2015 UK general election in the constituency of Kilmarnock and Loudoun for the Scottish Conservative and Unionist Party, coming 3rd with 12.5% of the vote.

At the 2016 elections to the Scottish Parliament, he was elected for the South Scotland region.

Controversy 

Whittle sparked a row over the two-child cap on tax credits by claiming “there is no such thing as a rape clause”, claiming it was impossible to debate the controversial welfare reform as “the term rape clause is an invention to beat the Tories with”. The remarks were widely condemned and described as “skin-crawling” by other parties.

Personal life
Whittle has three daughters.

References

External links 
 

1964 births
Living people
People from Troon
British male sprinters
Scottish male sprinters
Athletes (track and field) at the 1988 Summer Olympics
Olympic athletes of Great Britain
European Athletics Championships medalists
World Athletics Championships athletes for Great Britain
Commonwealth Games medallists in athletics
Athletes (track and field) at the 1986 Commonwealth Games
Athletes (track and field) at the 1990 Commonwealth Games
Athletes (track and field) at the 1994 Commonwealth Games
Commonwealth Games silver medallists for Scotland
British sportsperson-politicians
Conservative MSPs
Members of the Scottish Parliament 2016–2021
Members of the Scottish Parliament 2021–2026
Scottish Conservative Party parliamentary candidates
People educated at Marr College
Alumni of the University of Glasgow
Sportspeople from South Ayrshire
Medallists at the 1990 Commonwealth Games